NYU London is an academic centre of New York University located in London, United Kingdom. It is one of NYU's 14 global academic centres, and the largest of these which does not grant its own degrees, hosting around 480 students each semester.

Campus
The NYU London campus is located at 4–6 Bedford Square in Bloomsbury, London. The residence halls are also located in Bloomsbury, near Russell Square.

The university's main building, No. 6, was formerly home to the Oxford and Cambridge Musical Club between 1914 and 1940. A centennial concert was held in 2014. The building has a blue plaque commemorating another former resident, Lord Eldon.

Academic programs
NYU London hosts students from New York University's three degree-granting campuses in New York City, Abu Dhabi, and Shanghai, as well as study-abroad students from its partner universities in the United States.

Select first-year students in the NYU Liberal Studies core program and Global Liberal Studies program may spend their first year of studies at NYU London rather than at NYU's campus in New York City.

References

New York University
Universities and colleges in London